The Men's Super-G in the 2020 FIS Alpine Skiing World Cup involved six events, as the last two scheduled Super-Gs were canceled. 

With three events to go, 2016 discipline champion Aleksander Aamodt Kilde held a slim lead in the Super-G over four competitors ranging between 51 to 74 points behind; however, at a Super-G race in Hinterstoder, Austria, Kilde crashed and failed to finish, allowing the top two finishers in the race -- Swiss skier Mauro Caviezel (who had been in second and finished second) and local native Vincent Kriechmayr (who had been in fifth and won) -- to both pass Kilde with two races still to go in the season. Caviezel held a narrow three-point lead over Kriechmayr, with Kilde 29 points back and the other two still in close pursuit. However, the next-to-last Super-G of the season at Kvitfjell, Kilde's home turf, was cancelled due to bad weather, and then the finals were also cancelled due to the COVID-19 pandemic, thus handing the season title to Caviezel by the three-point margin . . . without the expected showdown.

Standings

DNF = Did Not Finish
DNS = Did Not Start

See also
 2020 Alpine Skiing World Cup – Men's summary rankings
 2020 Alpine Skiing World Cup – Men's Overall
 2020 Alpine Skiing World Cup – Men's Downhill
 2020 Alpine Skiing World Cup – Men's Giant Slalom
 2020 Alpine Skiing World Cup – Men's Slalom
 2020 Alpine Skiing World Cup – Men's Combined
 2020 Alpine Skiing World Cup – Men's Parallel
 World Cup scoring system

References

External links
 Alpine Skiing at FIS website

Men's Super-G
FIS Alpine Ski World Cup men's Super-G discipline titles